Tscherttegasse  is a station on  of the Vienna U-Bahn. It is located in the Meidling District. It opened on 15 April 1995 as part of the extension of the line from Philadelphiabrücke to Siebenhirten.

The station is located at the ground level and has two side platforms. There is one exit from the station.

References

Buildings and structures in Meidling
Railway stations opened in 1995
Vienna U-Bahn stations